Cerithiella pernambucoensis is a species of very small sea snail, a marine gastropod mollusc in the family Newtoniellidae. It was described by de Lima and de Barros, in 2007.

References

Newtoniellidae
Gastropods described in 2007